Aleksejs Grjaznovs (born 1 October 1997) is a Latvian footballer who plays as a midfielder for Valmiera Glass ViA and the Latvia national team.

Career

Club
On 25 December, Noah announced the signing of Grjaznovs.

International
Grjaznovs made his international debut for Latvia on 19 November 2019 in a UEFA Euro 2020 qualifying match against Austria, which finished as a 1–0 home win.

Career statistics

International

References

External links
 
 
 

1997 births
Living people
Footballers from Riga
Latvian footballers
Latvia youth international footballers
Latvia under-21 international footballers
Latvia international footballers
Association football midfielders
FK RFS players
Valmieras FK players
Latvian Higher League players